The Cayman Islands national cricket team is the team that represents the British overseas territory of the Cayman Islands in international cricket. The team is organised by the Cayman Islands Cricket Association, which has been an associate member of the International Cricket Council (ICC) since 2002, having previously been an affiliate member since 1997.

The Cayman Islands debuted internationally at the 2000 Americas Cricket Cup in Canada, and later in the year were invited to appear in the 2000–01 Red Stripe Bowl (the West Indian domestic limited-overs competition), where matches had list-A status. During the early 2000s, the Caymans often competed with Bermuda as the third-best team in the ICC Americas region, behind Canada and the United States. When the U.S. was suspended from the 2005 Intercontinental Cup, they were replaced by the Cayman Islands, with the team being afforded the opportunity to make its first-class debut.

In 2006 and 2008, the Cayman Islands played in the Stanford 20/20 tournament (where matches had full Twenty20 status). In the World Cricket League (WCL), Cayman Islands debuted in Division Three in 2007 but subsequently fell as low as Division Six before the WCL was abolished. The Caymans currently play in ICC Americas regional qualification tournaments.

History

The Cayman Islands became an affiliate member of the ICC in 1997 and played their first tournament three years later when they played in the ICC Americas Championship in Canada. They finished fourth in the tournament, their only win coming against Argentina. Later in the year, they played their first List A matches as part of the 2000–01 Red Stripe Bowl in the West Indies. They played against Bermuda, Guyana, the Leeward Islands and the Windward Islands in the first round, losing all their games.

The Cayman Islands gained associate membership of the ICC in 2002, a year in which they finished third in the Americas Championship in Buenos Aires, Argentina after recording wins against Argentina, the Bahamas and Bermuda. The 2004 Americas Championship served as a qualifying competition for the 2005 ICC Trophy, and a repeat of their third-place finish from 2002 would have qualified them for that tournament. Wins against Argentina and the Bahamas meant they could only finish fourth however. This did qualify them for a place in a repêchage tournament in early 2005 in Kuala Lumpur, Malaysia. They finished fifth in that tournament after beating Kuwait in a play-off match.

Later in 2005, the Cayman Islands took part in the ICC Intercontinental Cup, a tournament for ICC associate members with first-class status. They lost both their first round matches to Bermuda and Canada, thus not qualifying for the semi-finals. In 2006, they first played in the inaugural Stanford 20/20 tournament. They beat the Bahamas in the preliminary round, but lost to Trinidad & Tobago in the first round proper.

In August 2006, they finished third in Division One of the ICC Americas Championship after wins against Argentina and Canada. This qualified them for 2007 Division Three of the World Cricket League, which was played in May/June 2007 in Darwin, Australia. After beating Hong Kong and Tanzania in the first round, they lost to Argentina in the semi finals, and to Papua New Guinea in the third place play-off, thus finishing fourth in the tournament. In 2009 they again placed in 2009 Division Three in which they came 5th thus relegating to Division Four. Like Argentina their bad run continued and again finished fifth only winning over Argentina. In 2012, they managed to stop the fall, finishing fourth in 2012 Division Five.

2018-Present
In April 2018, the ICC decided to grant full Twenty20 International (T20I) status to all its members. Therefore, all Twenty20 matches played between Cayman Islands and other ICC members from 1 January 2019 have been full T20I matches. 

The Cayman Islands played their first T20I match against Canada on 18 August 2019, after finishing second in the Southern sub region qualification group and advancing to the Regional Final of the 2018–19 ICC World Twenty20 Americas Qualifier tournament.

Tournament history

ICC Intercontinental Cup

2004: Did not participate
2005: First round
2006: Did not participate
2007–08: Did not participate
2009–10: Did not participate

World Cricket League
2007: 4th in Division Three
2009: 5th in Division Three
2010: 5th in Division Four
2012: 4th in Division Five
2014: 6th in Division Five
2015: 6th in Division Six
2017: 8th in Division Five

ICC Americas Championship
2000: 4th place
2002: 3rd place
2004: 4th place
2006: 3rd place (Division One)
2008: 4th place (Division One)
2010: 5th place (Division One)

Records
International Match Summary — Cayman Islands
 
Last updated 4 March 2023

Twenty20 International 
 Highest team total: 180/6 v Bahamas on 17 April 2022 at Smith Road Oval, George Town
 Highest individual score: 73*, Ramon Sealy v Bahamas on 16 April 2022 at Smith Road Oval, George Town  
 Best individual bowling figures: 4/6, Alessandro Morris v Bahamas on 14 April 2022 at Jimmy Powell Oval, George Town

Most T20I runs for Cayman Islands

Most T20I wickets for Cayman Islands

T20I record versus other nations

Records complete to T20I #2013. Last updated 4 March 2023.

Other results
For a list of selected international matches played by Cayman Islands, see Cricket Archive.

Players
Performance by Cayman Island cricketers in World Cricket League matches

Highest scores

Steve Gordon – 104* vs Tanzania at Tracy Village Oval, Darwin on 27 May 2007

Ainsley Hall – 100* vs Tanzania at Tracy Village Oval, Darwin on 27 May 2007

Pearson Best – 85 vs Italy at Centro Sportivo Ca'Nova, Medicina on 19 August 2010

Conroy Wright – 79* vs Jersey at Bayuemas Oval, Kuala Lumpur on 10 March 2014

Pearson Best – 79 vs Guernsey at The Padang, Singapore on 25 February 2012

Best Bowling figures

Ryan Bovell – 5/9 vs Argentina at Indian Assoc. Ground, Singapore on 22 February 2012

Kervin Ebanks – 5/19 vs Guernsey at Royal Selangor Club, Kuala Lumpur on 6 March 2014

Franklyn Hinds – 4/22 vs Hong Kong at Tracy Village Oval, Darwin on 28 May 2007

Michael Wight – 4/30 vs Uganda at Marrara Oval, Darwin on 30 May 2007

Ryan Bovell – 4/35 vs Papua New Guinea at Belgrano ACG, Buenos Aires on 24 January 2009

Other players

In addition to those listed above, the following Cayman Islands cricketers have played first-class, List A or official Twenty20 cricket:

Marc Chin
Steadman Gray
Charles Greaves
Abali Hoilett
Carley James
Oscar Owen
Christopher Wight
David Wight
Philip Wight
Conroy Wright

See also
 Cayman Islands women's national cricket team
 Cricket in the Cayman Islands
 List of Cayman Islands Twenty20 International cricketers

References

External links
 Cayman Islands at CricketArchive

Cricket in the Cayman Islands
National cricket teams
Cricket
Cayman Islands in international cricket